The Reception is 2005 feature film directed and written by John G. Young and starring Pamela Holden Stewart, Darien Sills-Evans, Wayne Lamont Sims, Margaret Burkwit, and Chris Burmester.

Plot
The Reception is a drama set in wintry upstate New York. Hoping to cash in on an inheritance, Sierra (Margaret Burkwit) and her husband Andrew (Darien Sills-Evans) arrive at her mother's Jeannette's home only to discover resentful Jeannette (played by Pamela Holden Stewart) and her companion, the African-American artist Martin (Wayne Lamont Sims). Because the gay Martin is unable to satisfy her sexually, Jeannette takes to embarrassing him whenever she's drunk, yet Martin takes the abuse in strides.

Jeannette's daughter Sierra arrives as grandmother's fortune is hers to have once she is married. The newly-weds plan to stay just long enough to run away with the money. However, Jeannette throws a spanner in the works when she announces an impromptu wedding reception.

Cast
Pamela Holden Stewart as Jeannette
Darien Sills-Evans as Andrew
Wayne Lamont Sims as Martin
Margaret Burkwith as Sierra
Chris Burmester as Chuck

References

External links

2005 films
American LGBT-related films
2000s English-language films
2000s American films